Mikhael Daher (15 August 1928 – 14 February 2023) was a Lebanese lawyer and politician.

Biography
Born in Al-Qoubaiyat on 15 August 1928, Daher studied at Saint Joseph University and the Lebanese University. A Maronite, he was elected to the Parliament of Lebanon in 1972 for the Akkar Governorate in northern Lebanon. In 1988, with the mandate of President Amine Gemayel coming to an end, the United States and Syria attempted to keep him in office. However, the Christian militias successfully prevented his re-election. American special envoy to Lebanon, Richard Murphy, stated that it was "Mikhael Daher or chaos".

In 1992, Daher was re-elected to the Parliament on a pro-Syrian list. That year, he was appointed Minister of Education in the first government of Prime Minister Rafic Hariri. However, he was defeated in 1996, but regained his mandate as a deputy in 2000.

In 2005, Daher stood for re-election on the list of the Free Patriotic Movement, but he was defeated.

Mikhael Daher died in Beirut on 14 February 2023, at the age of 94.

References

1928 births
2023 deaths
Lebanese politicians
Candidates for President of Lebanon
Members of the Parliament of Lebanon
Education ministers of Lebanon
Grand Officers of the National Order of the Cedar
Lebanese University alumni
Saint Joseph University alumni
People from Akkar Governorate